H. maxima may refer to:

 Heteropoda maxima, a spider endemic to Laos
 Heuchera maxima, a plant endemic to the Channel Islands of California
 Honduriella maxima, a mite with a single pair of spiracles positioned laterally on the body
 Hydrostachys maxima, an African plant
 Hyla maxima, a New World frog